Christian Carlos Miniussi Ventureira (born 5 July 1967) is a former tennis player from Argentina.

Miniussi turned professional in 1984. He started playing tennis at the Adrogué Tennis Club and he also represented his native country as a lucky loser at the 1992 Summer Olympics in Barcelona, where he was defeated in the first round by France's Fabrice Santoro. In the doubles competition Miniussi claimed the bronze medal alongside Javier Frana.

The right-hander won one career title in singles (São Paulo, 1991). He reached his highest singles ATP-ranking on 18 May 1992, when he became the number 57 of the world.

ATP career finals

Singles: 2 (1 title, 1 runner-up)

Doubles: 10 (5 titles, 5 runner-ups)

Records
 These records were attained in the Open Era of tennis.

ATP Challenger and ITF Futures Finals

Singles: 6 (2–4)

Doubles: 11 (5–6)

Performance timelines

Singles

Doubles

References

External links
 
 
 
 

1967 births
Living people
Argentine male tennis players
Argentine people of Italian descent
Olympic bronze medalists for Argentina
Olympic medalists in tennis
Olympic tennis players of Argentina
People from Adrogué
Tennis players at the 1992 Summer Olympics
Medalists at the 1992 Summer Olympics
Pan American Games medalists in tennis
Pan American Games bronze medalists for Argentina
Tennis players at the 1983 Pan American Games
Competitors at the 1982 Southern Cross Games
South American Games gold medalists for Argentina
South American Games medalists in tennis
Sportspeople from Buenos Aires Province